Alexander Anatolevich Volkov (born 29 March 1964), commonly known as Sasha Volkov, is a retired Soviet and Ukrainian professional basketball player. He was born in Omsk, RSFSR, Soviet Union. At 6'10" (2.08 m) tall, he played at the power forward and center positions. He was versatile with the ball and quick on his feet, which made him a very sought after player.

Professional career
Volkov played professionally for Stroitel (1981–1986; 1988–1989), CSKA Moscow (1986–1988), in the NBA, with the Atlanta Hawks (1989–1992), Panasonic Reggio Calabria (1992–1993), Panathinaikos (1993–1994), Olympiacos (1994–1995), and Kyiv (2000–2002).

In USSR he was also selected MVP in 1989, and was one of the key players on the Soviet national team since 1985, winning the gold medal at the 1988 Seoul games.

In 1986 he became the second player from the Soviet Union to be drafted to the NBA. He was drafted by the Atlanta Hawks in the 6th round (Sabonis was drafted late in the first round). Volkov signed with the Hawks 3 years later on 1 August 1989. His brief career in NBA was hampered by injury as well as competition from several all-star front-men: Dominique Wilkins, Kevin Willis and Moses Malone. Volkov averaged 5 points and close to 2 rebounds per game during his first (89-90) season.  After missing the whole next season, he came back stronger, roughly doubling his statistical output on the floor and even starting in 27 games. Afterwards, he chose to continue his career in Europe.

He was one of the founders of BC Kyiv. Volkov, who had already retired from playing in 1995, returned to play several games, to help the newly found team in 2000. He later also served as the team's President.

National team career
Volkov won a gold medal at the 1988 Summer Olympics, as a member of the senior Soviet Union national basketball team. He also briefly came out of retirement, to play for the senior Ukrainian national basketball team, in 1998.

NBA career statistics

Regular season

|-
| style="text-align:left;"|
| style="text-align:left;"|Atlanta
| 72 || 4 || 13.0 || .482 || .382 || .583 || 1.7 || 1.2 || .5 || .3 || 5.0
|-
| style="text-align:left;"|
| style="text-align:left;"|Atlanta
| 77 || 27 || 19.7 || .441 || .318 || .631 || 3.4 || 3.2 || .9 || .4 || 8.6
|- class="sortbottom"
| style="text-align:center;" colspan="2"|Career
| 149 || 31 || 16.5 || .455 || .333 || .613 || 2.6 || 2.2 || .7 || .3 || 6.8

Political career
From 1999 to 2000, Volkov served as a chairman of the State Committee on Sports in Ukraine. In June 2007, he was elected  the head of the Ukrainian Basketball Federation.

Volkov was elected to the Ukrainian Parliament in 2006 on the party list of the Our Ukraine Bloc. But against the will of his faction, he joined the Anti-Crisis Coalition, which prompted early elections. In the early parliamentary elections in 2007 he was reelected to Parliament through the Party of Regions. Volkov was again elected through the Party of Regions to the Ukrainian Parliament in 2012. But left this party's faction in parliament on 17 April 2014. and joined the (then new) faction Economic Development one week later. In the 2014 Ukrainian parliamentary election Volkov failed to get reelected into parliament; he was number 9 on the election list of Strong Ukraine, but the party won only one constituency parliamentary seat.

Personal life 
In 2022, following the Russian invasion of Ukraine, Volkov joined Ukrainian volunteers fighting against Russian forces. Volkov's family home in Chernihiv was destroyed by the bombings.

References

External links
Alexander Volkov at nba.com

Alexander Volkov at Eurobasket.com
Alexander Volkov at legabasket.it 
Alexander Volkov at fiba.com
Alexander Volkov at fibaeurope.com
Sasha Volkov, the symbol of Ukrainian basketball

1964 births
Living people
Atlanta Hawks draft picks
Atlanta Hawks players
Basketball players at the 1988 Summer Olympics
Basketball players at the 1992 Summer Olympics
BC Budivelnyk players
BC Kyiv players
Centers (basketball)
Russian expatriate basketball people in Greece
FIBA EuroBasket-winning players
Honoured Masters of Sport of the USSR
Medalists at the 1988 Summer Olympics
National Basketball Association players from Ukraine
Olympiacos B.C. players
Olympic basketball players of the Soviet Union
Olympic basketball players of the Unified Team
Olympic gold medalists for the Soviet Union
Olympic medalists in basketball
Panathinaikos B.C. players
Party of Regions politicians
PBC CSKA Moscow players
Sportspeople from Omsk
Power forwards (basketball)
Recipients of the Order of Merit (Ukraine), 3rd class
Russian emigrants to Ukraine
Seventh convocation members of the Verkhovna Rada
Sixth convocation members of the Verkhovna Rada
Soviet men's basketball players
Soviet expatriate basketball people in the United States
Ukrainian men's basketball players
Ukrainian expatriate basketball people in Greece
Ukrainian expatriate basketball people in Italy
Ukrainian expatriate basketball people in the United States
Ukrainian sportsperson-politicians
Ukrainian State Committee chairmen of Youth, Physical Culture and Sport
Viola Reggio Calabria players
1986 FIBA World Championship players
1990 FIBA World Championship players
FIBA Hall of Fame inductees
Soviet expatriate basketball people